Route 146 is a limited-access road in the U.S. state of Rhode Island, maintained by the Rhode Island Department of Transportation (RIDOT). Spanning approximately  along a northwest–southeast axis, it links the cities of Providence, Woonsocket, and Worcester, Massachusetts.

The southern terminus of Route 146 is located at Interstate 95 (I-95) in Providence. The majority of the route is a controlled-access highway, with the exception of at-grade crossings and driveway access in the towns of North Smithfield and Lincoln. The northern terminus is located at the Rhode Island–Massachusetts state line in Millville, where it transitions into Massachusetts Route 146 and continues northbound towards the Massachusetts Turnpike in Millbury and I-290 in Worcester.

Route description
Route 146 begins in downtown Providence at I-95 northbound exit 38 (there is no direct access from I-95 southbound; access to Route 146 is via surface streets). Locally it is known as Old Louisquisset Pike, and is a narrow four-lane freeway with no shoulders and a simple Jersey barrier median separating oncoming traffic. The first two interchanges are partial access only, with Route 7 (Douglas Avenue) and Route 246 (Charles Street) and provide access between Route 146 and I-95 via surface streets for where there is no direct access (southbound I-95 to northbound Route 146, and southbound Route 146 to northbound I-95). The first complete interchange is a diamond interchange with Branch Avenue, followed by a partial interchange with Route 15 (no northbound entrance to Route 146). The next interchange, with Route 246 a second time, provides the access missing from the Route 15 interchange.

At this point, now in North Providence the "Old Louisquisset Pike" designation leaves to follow Route 246, and the Route 146 freeway becomes the Eddie Dowling Highway. Near the southern boundary of Lincoln, there is a southbound-only offramp (no other access) with Route 246, while the northbound side abuts Olney Pond in the Lincoln Woods State Park. Two partial cloverleaf interchanges follow with Twin River Road and Route 123/Breakneck Hill Road. The next interchange northbound is a right-in/right-out terminus of Sherman Avenue, while southbound has access to Route 246 here. A single onramp provides Wilbur Avenue an entrance to northbound Route 146 next, then a modified cloverleaf interchange with Route 116, followed shortly by a full cloverleaf interchange with I-295 and the southern terminus of Route 99, which is a short connector freeway to the city of Woonsocket. Route 99 access is a northbound exit/southbound entrance only, the other directions need to use surface streets for access.

North of this interchange, the road turns into a divided boulevard with at-grade crossings and driveway access through the southern part of the town of North Smithfield, Rhode Island. A stoplight marks the only major intersection, an at-grade crossing with Sayles Hill Road, which doubles back and has a right in/right out interchange with southbound Route 146. At the partial interchange with Route 146A (northbound exit and southbound entrance) the freeway resumes, now called the North Smithfield Expressway, which has three interchanges in the town: Route 104, Pound Hill Road, and a complex interchange with School Street and Route 146A that also provides access to Route 5 and Route 102.

History

Prior to the construction of the two freeway sections, Route 146 used present-day Route 246 and Route 146A. The only part of the original alignment still in use is the non-freeway section between I-295/Route 99 and Route 146A in the southern part of North Smithfield.

In May 2019, Route 146 received mile-based exit numbers. Previously, the exits were unnumbered.

Future
In May 2019, the Rhode Island Senate announced that the state would borrow $200 million to reconfigure I-95 through Downtown Providence, near the southern terminus of Route 146. The replacement of the Providence Viaduct with twin bridges is intended to alleviate the bottleneck created by traffic entering I-95 from the US Route 6 (US 6) and Route 10, and exiting towards Route 146 and US 44. The project is expected to cost $250 million.

In 2022, RIDOT began work on an overpass at Sayles Hill Road, the only set of traffic signals along the route in Rhode Island. The project also includes constructing service roads and bus bays, and rebuilding the interchange with Route 146A at Smithfield. Work is scheduled to be completed in 2026.

RIDOT erected two toll gantries in 2019, one in Lincoln and one in North Smithfield, for truck-only electronic toll collection.

Exit list
Exits were unnumbered until mid-2019, when RIDOT added mileage-based exit numbers to conform to federal highway standards.

Route 146A

Route 146A is a numbered state highway running  in Rhode Island. It was designated as Route 146 before the construction of the North Smithfield Expressway. The road follows a former stagecoach path through historic Union Village in North Smithfield. This road was known as "the Great Road". The northern end of the road crosses the state line near Buxton Street at Uxbridge, Massachusetts. This section was known as Ironstone, after good quality bog iron ore found near here.

It runs for  through North Smithfield on Route 146 to Massachusetts state line at Route 146A using Eddie Dowling Highway, Smithfield Road, Great Road, Victory Highway, North Main Street and Quaker Highway.

Major intersections

See also

References

External links

2019 Highway Map, Rhode Island

146
Transportation in Providence County, Rhode Island